Scinax camposseabrai is a frog in the family Hylidae.  It is endemic to Brazil.

References

Frogs of South America
camposseabrai

Endemic fauna of Brazil
Amphibians described in 1968